Kristian Laight (born 15 July 1980) is a British former professional boxer who competed from 2003 to 2018. In July 2018 he lost his 277th professional fight, which is known to be the most in boxing history, toppling the previous record, which was held since 2005 by Reggie Strickland. He was the debuting opponent for future British title holders Tyrone Nurse, Tommy Coyle and Lewis Ritson, and also fought Kevin Mitchell, and Derry Mathews, among others.

He was featured in a chapter of the 2014 book Journeymen: The Other Side of the Boxing Business by Mark Turley.

Laight enjoyed one of his most memorable victories in August 2015, when he upset Carl Chadwick in memory of his late trainer Lenny Woodhall, who had died a few weeks before.

He retired in 2018 with a record of 12–279–9, having been stopped only five times in his career. Following the announcement, Tony Bellew said that "without guys like him the pro game wouldn't exist" on Twitter.

References

External links
 

Living people
English male boxers
1980 births
Welterweight boxers
Sportspeople from Nuneaton